Neil Kerr (13 April 1871 – 2 December 1901) was a Scottish footballer who played mainly as an outside right, for clubs including Rangers and Liverpool.

He played for both clubs in their first seasons in the respective top divisions, featuring in every fixture for Rangers plus the championship play-off as they shared the 1890–91 Scottish Football League title with Dumbarton. He also won the Glasgow Cup with the Light Blues in 1893. He later re-joined the Govan club after spells with Liverpool, Nottingham Forest and non-league Falkirk, but was only a reserve in his second spell and featured in just four competitive matches, albeit one of these was in the semi-final second replay of the 1897–98 Scottish Cup, helping Rangers reach the final which they went on to win.

At representative level, Kerr took part in a Scottish national team trial match in March 1892, and in November of that year was selected for the Glasgow FA's annual challenge match against Sheffield.

He was the sole survivor of a yachting accident on the Firth of Clyde in 1896 in which two other men drowned, but died from gastritis in 1901 at the age of 30.

References

1871 births
Scottish footballers
Footballers from West Dunbartonshire
Liverpool F.C. players
1901 deaths
Cowlairs F.C. players
Dumbarton F.C. players
Rangers F.C. players
Nottingham Forest F.C. players
Falkirk F.C. players
Clyde F.C. players
Association football outside forwards
Scottish Football League players
English Football League players
Deaths from gastritis